Tunnicliffe or Tunnicliff is a surname, and may refer to:

Tunnicliffe
Anna Tunnicliffe (b. 1982), US sailor
Billy Tunnicliffe (1920-1997), British footballer
Billy Tunnicliffe (footballer born 1864) (1864- ?), British footballer 
Charles Tunnicliffe (1901-1979), British painter and illustrator
Colin Tunnicliffe (b. 1951), British cricketer
Damon G. Tunnicliff (1829-1901), American jurist
Denis Tunnicliffe, Baron Tunnicliffe (b. 1943), British pilot and railwayman
 Donna Tunnicliffe (b. 1970), Australian Psychologist
Garry Tunnicliffe, RAF Officer
Geoff Tunnicliffe (fl. 1980s-present), US-Canadian Christian evangelical leader 
James Tunnicliffe (b. 1989), British footballer
Jayne Tunnicliffe (b. 1967), British actress
John Tunnicliffe (1866-1948), British cricketer
John Tunnicliffe (footballer) (1866- ?), British footballer
Jordan Tunnicliffe (b. 1993) British footballer
Kenneth Colin Tunnicliffe, b.1944, Author, Aztec Astrology, pub.1979, L.N.Fowler
Ryan Tunnicliffe (b. 1992), British footballer
William W. Tunnicliffe (c.1922-1996), Canadian computer specialist

Tunnicliff
Jabez Tunnicliff (1809-1865), British Baptist minister and founder of the Band of Hope temperance movement
Miles Tunnicliff (b. 1968), British golfer
John Tunnicliff (c.1725 – 1800), US colonial figure